"Hit Me Up" is the second single by American singer Gia Farrell. The song is included on the Happy Feet movie soundtrack. It was released as a digital-download single in October 2006 and became a top-10 hit in Australia, Finland, and Hungary the following year.

Song information
The song is about a confident girl who gets attention everywhere she goes. She sings to a guy telling him to "hit me up". "To hit up", a term popularized by users of the social networking website MySpace, refers to contacting a person via electronic means. In this case there is a romantic interest for the person being "hit up".

"Hit Me Up" was used as the opening theme for Germany's Next Topmodel, Cycle 2 and as an official song for the 2007 CONCACAF Gold Cup soccer tournament. It was featured in a Wheat Thins's commercial for garden vegetable flavored crackers, and gained attention again when it was performed in May 2008 by Syesha Mercado on American Idol seventh season at the top three stage. The song was also in an episode of Gossip Girl Season 1 Episode 2, The Wild Brunch, when the cooks are getting ready for Bart Bass Brunch.

Chart performance
The song charted in several countries around the world. It reached number one in Hungary and entered the top 10 in Australia and Finland. In the United States, it peaked at number 40 on the Billboard Mainstream Top 40.

Music video
In the video the main basis is on the Happy Feet theme with Gia appearing in three different sets with dancers in the background while singing the song. A cameraman's hand gives Gia a spin before each transition. The only indications of the song being on the Happy Feet soundtrack is when Gia is singing out in the front of a theatre and above her on the movies showing list is Happy Feet, and also when in the middle of the video her backup dancers are seen in tuxedos and wearing costume penguin masks as they all dance in an arctic scene.

Track listings
Australian CD single
 "Hit Me Up" (album version)
 "Hit Me Up" (no taps version)
 "Hit Me Up" (Matt "The Bratt" radio edit)

European CD single
 "Hit Me Up" (album version)
 "Hit Me Up" (Matt "The Bratt" radio edit)

German, Austrian, and Swiss CD single
 "Hit Me Up" (album version)
 "Hit Me Up" (no taps version)
 "Hit Me Up" (Matt "The Bratt" radio edit)
 "Hit Me Up" (video)

Charts

Weekly charts

Year-end charts

Release history

References

2006 singles
2007 CONCACAF Gold Cup
Atlantic Records singles
CONCACAF Gold Cup official songs and anthems
Gia Farrell songs
Song recordings produced by Josh Schwartz
Songs written by Brian Kierulf
Songs written by Josh Schwartz